The Serlui  is a river of Mizoram, northeastern India. It flows through Kolasib district and is impounded by the Serlui B Dam.

It is known as Rukni, a tributary of Sonai River. It flows in a northerly direction towards Cachar district and joins the Sonai River near Sundari village in Cachar district.

References

Rivers of Mizoram
Rivers of India